Bush is a British consumer electronics brand owned by J Sainsbury plc (Sainsbury's), the parent company of the retailer Argos. The former Bush company is one of the most famous manufacturers of early British radios. The company is now defunct, but the Bush brand name survives as a private label brand for budget electronics. Today, all Bush are sold exclusively at Argos and Sainsbury's, with Argos having a wider selection.

History

Original Bush company
The company was founded in 1932 as Bush Radio from the remains of the Graham Amplion company, which had made horn loudspeakers as a subsidiary of the Gaumont British Picture Corporation.  The brand name comes from Gaumont's Shepherd's Bush studios. The company expanded rapidly moving to a new factory at Power Road, Chiswick in 1936.

Bush became part of the Rank empire in 1945 and a brand new factory was opened at Ernesettle, Plymouth in 1949. In 1950 the popular DAC90A and DAC10 radios were launched, along with the distinctive TV22 television.

The Bush TR82 transistor radio, designed by Ogle Design, and launched in 1959, is regarded as an icon of early radio design. Although the first radio to use the Ogle cabinet design was actually the MB60, a battery/mains valve set from 1957 to 1959.

The original Bush Radio company merged with Murphy Radio on 4 June 1962, and a new company was formed called Rank Bush Murphy Ltd. In 1978, Rank Bush Murphy was sold to British conglomerate Great Universal Stores.

Rank formed a joint venture with Toshiba in 1978 called Rank Toshiba, and manufactured Toshiba designed televisions in Ernesettle UK. In 1980 Rank terminated its agreement with Toshiba and the joint company was wound up. Toshiba took over the UK factory and continued to manufacture television sets alone.

Purchase in the 1980s
The Bush brand name disappeared from the British market during the 1980s. However, since the purchase of the brand by Alba Group in 1986 (now known as Harvard International), it once again became common, being used primarily on electronic goods produced in China and televisions made in Turkey.

Sale to Home Retail Group
In November 2008, the Bush brand name, along with Alba, was purchased by Home Retail Group, the parent company of Homebase and Argos, for £15.25 million. As a result, the former Alba Group has now been renamed Harvard International. Harvard International still owns the Bush brand in Oceania. In 2013 a 7-inch tablet called MyTablet was released under the Bush brand; it cost £99.99.

Purchase by Sainsbury's
In September 2016, the British supermarket chain Sainsbury's completed its acquisition of Home Retail Group, bringing Argos, along with the Alba and Bush brands, under its ownership.

In 2022 the Bush brand replaced the Alba brand, enabling Sainsbury's to have one main own brand electronics brand.

Product range

Current products
Bush now has products including: televisions, boomboxes, shelf stereos, set-top boxes, washing machines, radios, trimmers, headsets, headphones, ovens, cookers, fridges, computer mice, webcams, microphones, turntables, DVD players, Blu-ray players, home cinemas, MP3 players, MP4 players, dishwashers, camcorders, smartphones and tablets.

At least some of the Bush TV sets and some White Goods are made by Turkish company Vestel.

Reproductions of classic Bush Radio models from the 1950s and 1960s are also being sold today under the Bush brand. Some of these units also include DAB tuners.

Former products
A range known as Bush iD was used to brand items such as digital radios and set-top boxes under the Bush name since the 1980s. Since the purchase by Home Retail Group in 2008, the Bush iD branding is no longer used.

Marketing and branding

Bush has had a number of different logos over the years. It had a long standing one between the 1990s and 2014, and a separate one for its former Bush iD range.

Gallery

References

Sources
Radio and television brands Alba and Bush sold to Argos owner Home Retail Group
Home Retail Group signs contract for Intellectual Property Rights to Bush and Alba Trademarks 
Bush Freesat Website

External links
Bush at Argos.co.uk
Site on vintage Bush radios
1950 Bush television https://web.archive.org/web/20151004114901/http://www.sciencemuseum.org.uk/objects/radio_communication/1971-76.aspx
Traditional Bush Radios for sale
Bush Australia

Electronics companies of the United Kingdom
Electronics companies established in 1932
Consumer electronics brands
Audio equipment manufacturers of the United Kingdom
Headphones manufacturers
British brands
Companies based in Milton Keynes
Display technology companies
1932 establishments in England
Radio manufacturers
Sainsbury's